Garella is a genus of moths of the family Nolidae. The genus was erected by Francis Walker in 1863.

Species
Garella basalis Berio, 1966 Madagascar, Reunion
Garella casuaria (Wileman & West, 1929) Philippines
Garella curiosa (C. Swinhoe, 1890) Myanmar, north-eastern Himalayas, Java, Sulawesi, New Guinea, Australia
Garella nephelota Hampson, 1912 northern Nigeria
Garella nilotica (Rogenhofer, 1882) Greece, tropics
Garella nubilosa Hampson, 1912 Kenya
Garella rotundipennis Walker, [1863] Borneo, Java, New Guinea
Garella ruficirra (Hampson, 1905) Japan, north-eastern Himalayas, Borneo
Garella scoparioides (Walker, [1863]) tropical Asia, Borneo, Queensland, Fiji
Garella submediana (Wiltshire, 1986) Arabia, Ethiopia, Kenya, Zimbabwe, South Africa, Nigeria
Garella vallata (Meyrick, 1902) Queensland
Garella vernoides Holloway, 2003 Borneo

References

Chloephorinae